The 1985 Cal Poly Mustangs football team represented California Polytechnic State University during the 1985 NCAA Division II football season.

Cal Poly competed in the Western Football Conference (WFC). The WFC added two new members for the 1985 season, Cal Lutheran and Cal State Sacramento. The Mustangs were led by fourth-year head coach Jim Sanderson and played home games at Mustang Stadium in San Luis Obispo, California. They finished the season with a record of four wins and seven losses (4–7, 2–3 WFC). Overall, the team was outscored by its opponents 266–303 for the season.

Schedule

Team players in the NFL
The following Cal Poly Mustang players were selected in the 1986 NFL Draft.

Notes

References

Cal Poly
Cal Poly Mustangs football seasons
Cal Poly Mustangs football